Danish New Zealanders are New Zealanders with full or partial Danish ancestry. The majority of these people are part of the Danish diaspora.

History 
There is a small Danish community in New Zealand, descended from a group of early settlers who came to clear thick North Island bush in the middle years of the 19th century and stayed to found settlements including Dannevirke and Norsewood. High-ranking Danish churchman, Bishop Ditlev Gothard Monrad, who had been Danish Prime Minister during the Second Schleswig War, left Denmark as a result of the war and settled with his family in Karere near Palmerston North in 1866, where he set up the first dairy plant in the region. Monrad returned to Denmark in 1869, but other members of his family stayed in New Zealand. He left behind his collection of art now housed at the Museum of New Zealand Te Papa Tongarewa. Those who stayed cleared the bush in the area, and their efforts helped convince Julius Vogel that they were suitable in character to become part of his planned 'Great Public Works' scheme of the 1870s. Isaac Featherston went to Scandinavia in 1870 to attract settlers in Norway, Sweden and Denmark. The first settlers from this initiative arrived in 1871 and settled in the bush between Palmerston North and Foxton. Other Danes came to the Seventy Mile Bush area in 1872 and founded the town which retains the Danish name of Dannevirke, commemorating the Danevirke in Slesvig. The other town created by the Danes was Norsewood. Both those towns were named by the government.

New Zealand has encouraged immigration of temporary workers from Denmark.

Culture 
When the Danes immigrated to New Zealand, they brought with them their language, festivals, food and culture and assimilated to New Zealand society, such as by learning English. There is the Danish Society Inc. in Auckland which promotes Danish history, culture and language within New Zealand. There is also the Danish Societies in the upper North Island, which includes the Danish Society, Hamilton and the Danish Society, Auckland which hosts festivals and run a newsletter.

Notable Danish New Zealanders

See also 

 Denmark–New Zealand relations
 European New Zealanders
 Europeans in Oceania
 Immigration to New Zealand
 Pākehā
 Scandinavian New Zealanders

References

Further reading 
 
 

 
European New Zealander